Kevin Duré (born 8 March 1993) is a retired Norwegian professional football player who played as a central defender. He has been on trial with the German clubs Werder Bremen and SC Freiburg, and the Austrian club Red Bull Salzburg.

Club career
Dure was born in Bergen, and started his career in the youth department of Løv-Ham.  He was on a trial with the Austrian club Red Bull Salzburg, but came home without a contract and was taken up in Løv-Ham first team squad in 2009 where he made his debut in Adeccoligaen against Moss FK on 26 July 2009.

In 2010 Dure came in as a substitute in Brann's friendly match against Leeds, and Brann, the biggest club in Bergen, wanted to sign Dure and Fredrik Haugen. Dure decided to refuse Brann's offer, because he wanted to play every week and the German clubs Werder Bremen and SC Freiburg had invited Dure on a trial. In July 2011, Dure was on a trial with Rosenborg, and in August 2011 he was chased by the Tippeligaen clubs Rosenborg, Start and Fredrikstad FK. On 22 August 2011 Dure signed a contract lasting till the end of 2014 with Fredrikstad, with a transfer fee of 1 million Norwegian kroner. On 17 September 2011 he made his debut in Tippeligaen, in Fredrikstad match against Molde FK

International career
Dure have represented Norway at youth international level.

Career statistics

Source:

References

Living people
1993 births
Footballers from Bergen
Norwegian footballers
Association football defenders
Løv-Ham Fotball players
Fredrikstad FK players
Nest-Sotra Fotball players
Åsane Fotball players
Norwegian First Division players
Eliteserien players